Jedward's Big Adventure is a children's television programme airing on CBBC. It is hosted by Irish twins Jedward (John and Edward Grimes) and follows them as they visit various UNESCO historical sites around the United Kingdom.

Each teaming up with celebrity guests, the twins are tasked with learning as much about each site as possible, before leading a tour of real tourists and passing on what they've learned.

Two series of five episodes each were produced and broadcast, whilst a third series was extended to 10 episodes, broadcast in January 2014.

Premise

Each episode sees the twins taken on guided tours around various historical landmarks where there are given facts to learn. After this, each twin is given a celebrity helper forming Team John and Team Edward. They must then relay the facts first to their celebrity helper, and then later on to a group of tourists, trying to make the facts as clear and memorable as possible.

At the end of each tour, the tourists are given a quiz to test their knowledge on what they have learnt, with questions corresponding to the subjects taught by each team. The winner is the team whose tourists scored highest. The losing team faces a forfeit. For the second and third series, the winning team also won a special treat.

Transmissions

Episodes

Series 1

Series 2

Series 3

References

External links

2012 British television series debuts
2014 British television series endings
BBC children's television shows
British children's television series
Jedward
Television series by Endemol
English-language television shows